"No Love" is a song recorded by South Korean hip-hop group Lucky J. It was released by YMC Entertainment as a digital single on January 8, 2016, in South Korea and on January 22 internationally. The song was written by group member J'Kyun and composer Famousbro, who also produced the song alongside Paul.

Background and development
"No Love" was written by Lee Kyun (J'Kyun) and Famousbro. Production was handled by Famousbro and Paul. It was announced on December 7, 2015, that the group was working on a new song soon-to-be released, with no exact date. On January 4, 2016, it was released a teaser for the music video, being officially released on January 7.

Promotion
The group started promotions on Mnet's M! Countdown on January 7, 2016. They continued on KBS's Music Bank on January 8, MBC's Show! Music Core on January 9 and on SBS's Inkigayo on January 10, and among others for the month of January.

Chart performance
The song failed to enter the Gaon Digital Chart, for combines sales of digital downloads and streaming in South Korea, but managed to enter the Gaon Download Chart at number 87 with 16,538 downloads sold, for the week ending January 9, 2016. This mark the first entry of the group to any charts of Gaon.

Charts

Weekly

References

2016 songs